Frederick Gustavus Schwatka (29 September 1849 – 2 November 1892) was a United States Army lieutenant with degrees in medicine and law, and was a noted explorer of northern Canada and Alaska.

Early life and career

Schwatka was born in Galena, Illinois, the son of Frederick Gustavus Sr. and Amelia (Hukill) Schwatka. His father Frederick G. Sr. (1810-1888) was born in Baltimore, Maryland, the son of August and Catherine (Geissendorfer) Schwatke (the original German spelling with the same pronunciation), German Lutheran immigrants from East Prussia (now eastern Poland) and Bavaria, respectively.  His mother Amelia Hukill (1812-1885) was born near Bethany, Brooke County, in present-day West Virginia and was of English and Scots descent.  When he was 10 his family moved to Salem, Oregon. Schwatka later worked in Oregon as a printer's apprentice and attended Willamette University. He was appointed to the United States Military Academy at West Point in 1867 and graduated in 1871, serving as a second lieutenant in the Third Cavalry in the Dakota Territory. Studying law and medicine simultaneously, he was admitted to the Bar association of Nebraska in 1875 and received his medical degree from Bellevue Medical College in New York in the same year.  In 1876, Lt. Schwatka led the initial cavalry charge at the Battle of Slim Buttes.

Search for Franklin's expedition
In 1878–80, at the behest of the American Geographical Society he led an expedition to the Canadian Arctic to look for written records thought to have been left on or near King William Island by members of Franklin's lost expedition. It was supported by various New York businessmen including Henry Grinnell, James Gordon Bennett, and Charles Patrick Daly. 

Traveling to Hudson Bay on the schooner Eothen, Schwatka's initial team included William Henry Gilder, his second in command; naturalist and artist Heinrich W. Klutschak; experienced seaman Frank E. Melms; and Joe Ebierbing, an Inuit interpreter and guide who had assisted explorer Charles Francis Hall in his search for Franklin between 1860 and 1869.

The party landed on Depot Island in Hudson Bay at about 16:00 in the afternoon of 7 August 1878. The group, assisted by other Inuit, went north from Hudson Bay "with three sledges drawn by over forty dogs, relatively few provisions, but a large quantity of arms and ammunition." The search was conducted under some of the coldest conditions experienced in polar exploration.

Later career
In 1883, he was sent to reconnoiter the Yukon River by the US Army. Going over the Chilkoot Pass, his party built rafts and floated down the Yukon River to its mouth in the Bering Sea, naming many geographic features along the way. Schwatka's expedition alarmed the Canadian government, which sent an expedition under George Mercer Dawson to explore the Yukon in 1887. After his resignation from the army in 1885, Schwatka led two private expeditions to Alaska financed by William D. Boyce  and three to northeastern Mexico and published descriptions of the social customs and the flora and fauna of these regions.

Schwatka received the Roquette Arctic Medal from the Geographical Society of Paris, and a medal from the Imperial Geographical Society of Russia. He was an honorary member of the Geographical Societies of Bremen, Geneva, and Rome.

Works
Schwatka's book-length publications include Along Alaska's Great River (1885) and The Search for Franklin (1882), republished in 1965 as The Long Arctic Search.

Death
He died in Portland, Oregon at the age of 43 in 1892. The New York Times reported his death as the outcome of an accidental overdose of morphine but the Coconino Sun of Coconino county (Flagstaff), Arizona listed his death as a suicide by laudanum. Schwatka was buried in Salem, Oregon.

Legacy
Schwatka Lake in Whitehorse, Yukon, is named after him, as is Mount Schwatka, Alaska. In 2007, an Arctic Sharps rifle commemorating Frederick Schwatka was begun by a group of prominent American gunsmiths. Engraved by Barry Lee Hands, the rifle depicts scenes from the arctic adventures of Schwatka (See "External Links" below). Since 1960,  the cruise boat the MV Schwatka has ferried passengers along the Yukon River through Miles Canyon to Schwatka Lake.

Frederick Schwatka was initiated to the Scottish Rite Freemasonry at the St. John's Lodge No. 37, Yreka, California.

See also
Ketosis Adaptation, the "Schwatka Imperative"

References

Works cited

 Sandler, Martin (2006). Resolute: The Epic Search for the Northwest Passage and John Franklin, and the Discovery of the Queen's Ghost Ship. New York: Sterling Publishing Co. 
 Savours, Ann (1999). The Search for the North West Passage.  New York: St. Martin's Press.  
 Schwatka, Frederick (1965). The Long Arctic Search. Ed. Edouard A. Stackpole. New Bedford, Mass.: Reynolds-DeWalt

Further reading

Books
 Coleman, E.C. (2006). The Royal Navy in Polar Exploration from Franklin to Scott. Tempus Publishing
 Schwatka, Frederick (1885). Along Alaska's Great River. New York: Cassell & Company  
 Schwatka, Frederick (1894). A Summer in Alaska. St Louis, Missouri: J.W. Henry
 Schwatka, Frederick (1886). Children of the Cold. New York: Cassell & Company
 Schwatka, Frederick (1893). In the Land of Cave and Cliff Dwellers. New York: Cassell & Company
 Schwatka, Frederick (1885). Nimrod in the North. New York: Cassell & Company

Articles
 Schwatka, Frederick. "Among the Apaches", Century Magazine, Vol. XXXIV (May 1887)

External links 

 UAM:EH:UA68-029-0001AB A wooden box camera used by Schwatka on his 1886 failed attempt to climb Mount Saint Elias

 
 
 
 
 

1849 births
1892 deaths
19th-century American memoirists
American people of German descent
Drug-related deaths in Oregon
Explorers of Alaska
Explorers of Canada
Explorers of the Arctic
People from Galena, Illinois
People from Salem, Oregon
People of the Great Sioux War of 1876
United States Army Medical Corps officers
United States Army officers
Willamette University alumni